Madison Township is one of the 25 townships of Licking County, Ohio, United States. As of the 2010 census, the population was 3,211, of whom 3,165 lived in the unincorporated part of the township.

Geography
Located in the eastern part of the county, it borders the following townships and cities:
Mary Ann Township - north
Perry Township - northeast
Hanover Township - east
Hopewell Township - southeast corner
Franklin Township - south
Heath - southwest
Newark - west
Newark Township - west
Newton Township - northwest corner

Name and history
It is one of 20 Madison Townships statewide.

Government
The township is governed by a three-member board of trustees, who are elected in November of odd-numbered years to a four-year term beginning on the following January 1. Two are elected in the year after the presidential election and one is elected in the year before it. There is also an elected township fiscal officer, who serves a four-year term beginning on April 1 of the year after the election, which is held in November of the year before the presidential election. Vacancies in the fiscal officership or on the board of trustees are filled by the remaining trustees.

References

External links

County website

Townships in Licking County, Ohio
Townships in Ohio